Stephen Kent, MHA, (born May 7, 1978) is a former Canadian politician in Newfoundland and Labrador. Kent served as the deputy premier, Minister of Health and Community Services, Minister Responsible for the Office of Public Engagement in the cabinet of Paul Davis. Previously he served as the Minister of Municipal and Intergovernmental Affairs, the Minister Responsible for Fire and Emergency Services – Newfoundland and Labrador, and Registrar General in the cabinets of Kathy Dunderdale and Tom Marshall. He served as the Member of the Newfoundland and Labrador House of Assembly for the District of Mount Pearl North from 2007 until 2017.

Prior to entering provincial politics Kent has served as Mayor and deputy mayor of the City of Mount Pearl and he has worked as the chief executive officer for Big Brothers Big Sisters of Eastern Newfoundland, as the executive director at United Way of Canada, Newfoundland and Labrador, and as the manager of corporate development at Stirling Communications. He has also served as the chief commissioner and chair of the board of governors for Scouts Canada. Kent became CAO of Mount Pearl in October 2017; he resigned in 2020.

Background
Kent was born in Stephenville in 1978 and lived in Paradise before moving to Mount Pearl in 1980. Kent graduated from O'Donel High School in Mount Pearl in 1996, where he had held the position of student council president. In 2001, he completed a bachelor's degree in business aAdministration and a Certificate in public administration, at Memorial University of Newfoundland. In May 2003, he received his master's degree in management from McGill University in Montreal.

From April 1999 to September 2004, Kent held the position of chief executive officer at Big Brothers Big Sisters of Eastern Newfoundland, where he served as president of the organization's Atlantic Staff Association, and in 2003 was appointed to the Organizational Development Committee.

In 2004, Kent became manager of corporate development with OZ FM, and served as the acting station manager. He went on to become the executive director at United Way, Newfoundland and Labrador. In 2006, he launched The FOCUS Group Consulting to provide management and marketing services to private and volunteer sector organizations. He and his wife Janet, own Focus Driver Training, which operates four Young Drivers of Canada offices in Newfoundland and Labrador.

Municipal politics
Kent began his political career as a teenager, first serving on school councils, in Youth Parliament and on the Youth Council for the City of Mount Pearl. In 1997, at age 19, he ran a successful campaign for city council and was elected deputy mayor of Mount Pearl (a position assigned to the councillor with the most votes), the youngest elected official in the city's history. He became the eighth mayor of Mount Pearl in 2003 when Dave Denine moved on to provincial politics, and he was elected mayor by acclamation in 2005.

During his time on city council, Kent was chair of various committees including the Parks and Recreation Committee, the human resources and finance committee and the Planning and Use Committee. He also sat on the Economic Development Committee, the Technical Services Committee and the Regional Fire Services Committee. He was also co-chair of the Mount Pearl Drug Strategy Committee. Kent was also the Avalon Director on the board of directors for Municipalities Newfoundland and Labrador, and an active member of the Atlantic Mayors Congress.

In 2002, Kent was appointed to a three-year term on the Minister's Advisory Committee to review the province's new Child, Youth and Family Services Act. From January 2003 to October 2004, Kent was part of the Premier's Council on Social Development.

Federal politics

In March 2000, Kent announced he was seeking the Liberal Party of Canada nomination for a by-election to be held in the riding of St. John's West. After his announcement The Telegram revealed that a string of emails obtained by their paper showed that Kent had been considering seeking the Canadian Alliance nomination in the riding. Kent told The Telegram he thought the Canadian Alliance were too right-wing, but the emails showed that Kent thought it would be useful if the party conducted a poll to find out people's thoughts on him running. When announcing his candidacy for the Liberal nomination he said; "I support the work that the Liberal governments are doing. And it only made sense for me to seek the Liberal nomination at this time." Kent was supported in his nomination campaign by fellow Mount Pearl City Councillor Lucy Stoyles. Anthony Sparrow went on to win the Liberal Party nomination for the by-election. Kent, who reportedly came a close second in the nomination, said; "I'll be working for Mr. Sparrow first thing in the morning".

Kent was a delegate from St. John's South—Mount Pearl at the 2006 federal Liberal leadership convention in Montreal. On December 5, 2006, Kent donated $425 to the Liberal Party of Canada.

Provincial politics 
Progressive Conservative member of the House of Assembly (MHA) Harvey Hodder opted to not to run for re-election in the 2007 Newfoundland and Labrador general election. Kent announced his intentions to seek the PC nomination in the new district of Mount Pearl North. On June 19, 2007, he was elected as the Progressive Conservative candidate for the provincial election, taking 1,151 of 1,352 votes, over the only other contestant, Keith Cassell. In the subsequent general election, he was elected MHA for the electoral district of Mount Pearl North with 85% of the popular vote in the October 9, 2007, provincial election. On October 30, 2007, he resigned as Mayor of Mount Pearl in order to be sworn in as MHA.

On October 13, 2010, Kent was named Parliamentary Secretary to the Minister Responsible for the Forestry and Agrifoods Agency.

Kent was re-elected as the MHA for Mount Pearl North on October 11, 2011.

In October 2013, Kent was named Minister of Municipal and Intergovernmental Affairs, Minister Responsible for Fire and Emergency Services and Registrar General. In January 2014, in addition to those portfolios he was also named Minister Responsible for the Office of Public Engagement. Kent resigned from his Cabinet positions on July 3, 2014, in order to run for the leadership of the provincial Progressive Conservative Party.

Kent was a candidate in the 2014 PC leadership election to succeed Kathy Dunderdale. He placed third with 20.7% of the vote and was eliminated on the first ballot.

On September 30, 2014, Kent was named deputy premier, Minister of Health and Community Services, and Minister Responsible for the Office of Public Engagement. His cabinet responsibilities ended upon the swearing in of the new Liberal cabinet after change in government on December 13, 2015.

In the 2015 election, Kent was re-elected, defeating Liberal candidate Mount Pearl Mayor Randy Simms.

In September 2017, Kent announced that he would resign his seat in October to become Chief Administrative Officer of the City of Mount Pearl. He officially resigned on October 11.

Post-politics
Kent resigned his seat on October 11, 2017, to become chief administrative officer of the City of Mount Pearl. In October 2019, an out-of-province labour lawyer was brought in to investigate Kent's workplace interactions with city staff following complaints by several municipal workers. Kent was placed on administrative leave in October 2019. He resigned as CAO on June 25, 2020, days after the City Council of Mount Pearl tabled a motion to dismiss him from the position. Allegations made in the case included that Kent had mocked subordinates in front of other staff and berated workers verbally. In 2019, it was alleged Kent used a city-hired consultant for personal work related to his volunteer work with outside organizations; Kent stated it did not cost the City.

Electoral history 

|-

|-

|NDP
|Kurtis Coombs
|align="right"|994
|align="right"|19.55%
|align="right"|
|-

|}

|-

|-

|NDP
|Janice Lockyer
|align="right"|319
|align="right"|5.71%
|align="right"|
|-
|}

|-

|}

References

External links

 Official website
 
 
 

1978 births
Mayors of Mount Pearl
Members of the Executive Council of Newfoundland and Labrador
Progressive Conservative Party of Newfoundland and Labrador MHAs
Deputy premiers of Newfoundland and Labrador
Living people
Health ministers of Newfoundland and Labrador
People from Stephenville, Newfoundland and Labrador
People from Paradise, Newfoundland and Labrador
21st-century Canadian politicians
Newfoundland and Labrador municipal councillors